Verónica Blume (born 17 July 1977 in Germany) is a fashion model and actress based in Spain. She is best known to American audiences in the role of Veronica on the television sitcom Out of the Blue.

References

External links 
 
 

1977 births
Living people
Spanish film actresses
Spanish female models
Spanish people of Uruguayan descent
Spanish television actresses